"Übers Ende der Welt" and "Ready, Set, Go!" are songs by German alternative rock band Tokio Hotel. The German version of the song, "Übers Ende der Welt", was released as the first single from their second album, Zimmer 483, and serves as the album's opening track. The key of the song is D-sharp minor.

The song was later translated into English and re-recorded for Tokio Hotel's first English-language album, Scream, under the title "Ready, Set, Go!". The English version was released as the second single from the album Scream in mainland Europe and was released as the band's debut single in the United Kingdom. This song was also released as the debut single in Canada via MuchMusic. The music video was nominated for the "Best Pop Video" award as well as winning the "Best New Artist" award at the 2008 MTV Video Music Awards.

Tokio Hotel collaborated with Jade Puget of AFI to create a remix of "Ready, Set, Go!". It was included as a bonus track on their album Scream.

Music video
The music video for the German version, "Übers Ende der Welt", features the four band-members as workers walking through a bleak futuristic city along with a group of catatonic co-workers. All wear the same grey overalls while carrying large pipes. When the workers pass a corridor, they notice Tokio Hotel playing the song on a stage at the end of the corridor. The workers, including the band members in their worker-characters, run towards the performance and subsequently escape from the city by climbing up the walls of the sky-scrapers around the stage. Scenes of the catatonic workers in a dining hall, silently watching a test screen (which eventually explodes) are also included in the video. The video concludes with a shot of the band members (in their worker-characters) standing on top of one of the city's sky-scrapers, blinded by the sunlight. The music video is mostly inspired on Apple's 1984 Macintosh advertisement.

The most recent version of the music video for "Ready, Set, Go!" is visually identical to the German "Übers Ende der Welt" music video. In early 2008, an alternate music video for "Ready, Set, Go!" screened frequently shown on The N cable-television channel. The music video played in between commercial breaks. This version did not feature the band members portrayed as workers, but it did feature the band playing in front of the test screen seen in the original German music video.

Track listings
 CD single: Übers Ende der Welt
 "Übers Ende der Welt" (single version) – 3:35
 "Übers Ende der Welt" (akustik version) – 3:27

 CD maxi single: Übers Ende der Welt
 "Übers Ende der Welt" (single version) – 3:35
 "Übers Ende der Welt" (akustik version) – 3:27
 "Hilf mir fliegen" – 3:44
 "Tokio Hotel in Moskau" (video)
 "Tokio Hotel Gallery"

 7-inch vinyl UK single: Ready, Set, Go!
 "Ready, Set, Go!" – 3:34
 "Black" – 3:21

 CD single: Ready, Set, Go!
 "Ready, Set, Go!" – 3:34
 "Übers Ende der Welt" (single version) – 3:35
 "Übers Ende der Welt" (acoustic version) – 3:27
 "Hilf mir fliegen" – 3:44

 CD UK single: Ready, Set, Go!
 "Ready, Set, Go!" – 3:34
 "Live Every Second" – 3:51

 CD maxi single: Ready, Set, Go!
 "Ready, Set, Go!" – 3:34
 "Ready, Set, Go!" (Grizzly remix) – 3:16
 "Black" – 3:21
 "Ready, Set, Go!" (music video)

Charts

"Übers Ende der Welt"

Weekly charts

Year-end charts

"Ready, Set, Go!"

Release history

References

Tokio Hotel songs
2007 singles
2007 songs
German-language songs
Island Records singles
Number-one singles in Austria
Number-one singles in Germany
Polydor Records singles
Songs written by David Jost
Songs written by Bill Kaulitz
Songs written by Tom Kaulitz
Universal Music Group singles